State Road 727 (SR 727) is a  state highway in the Pensacola metropolitan area. It is one of four "misnumbered" state road 7xx highways in the Pensacola area. It is locally known as West Fairfield Drive and South Fairfield Drive. Its southern terminus is at an intersection with SR 292 (Gulf Beach Highway). Its northern terminus is an intersection with SR 295 (New Warrington Road) in West Pensacola. From the eastern terminus, Fairfield Drive continues eastward with the SR 295 designation until SR 289 (Ninth Avenue) in Pensacola. Until the mid-1990s, the route was designated State Road 289A.

Like SR 295 and the nearby SR 296, SR 298, and SR 742, SR 727 is primarily a bypass route for Pensacola. Motorists traveling near the Gulf of Mexico shore west of Pensacola often use Fairfield Drive to avoid the downtown section and continue eastward via Interstate 110 (I-110; SR 8A) to I-10 (SR 8) and then crossing Escambia Bay on the Interstate highway.

Major intersections

References

External links

Southeastroads.com page on State Road 727

727
727